BBVA Argentina, formerly BBVA Banco Francés, is a financial institution in Argentina.

History
Founded on October 14, 1886, in Buenos Aires as Banco Francés del Río de la Plata, it is the oldest private bank in Argentina. Its Beaux-Arts headquarters, designed by Jorge Bunge, were inaugurated in 1926.

Morgan Guaranty Trust acquired a 50% share in the bank in 1968, though the New York-based bank sold most of these to Alpargatas, a leading local industrial firm, a decade later.

Despite the nation's economic woes during the 1980s, the Banco Francés expanded from 15 branches to 62 during the decade, and entered into a joint venture with Bankers Trust Company in 1986. Alpargatas sold its stake to local developer Eduardo Constantini in 1991, and entered into a second joint venture with Merrill Lynch in 1992.

In December 1996, Spain's Banco Bilbao Vizcaya, (now Banco Bilbao Vizcaya Argentaria), acquired the 99.9% of the common shares of Otar S.R.L., which was a major shareholder of Sud América Inversiones S.A., and holder of over 30% of the capital of Banco Francés, hence the BBVA in its name.

 BBVA was the fifth-largest bank in Argentina and the third-largest private one, with deposits of US$6.7 billion and a lending portfolio of US$5.4 billion a(a roughly 6% domestic share in both areas). It maintained 245 branches and almost 1,400 ATMs in Argentina, and employed around 5,200 staff. The bank announced in 2013 it would relocate its headquarters to the Consultatio Tower, in the Catalinas Norte office park, upon the Tower's completion in 2015.

In 2019, BBVA unifies its brand worldwide and BBVA Francés was renamed BBVA.

References

External links
 

Companies listed on the New York Stock Exchange
Companies listed on the Buenos Aires Stock Exchange
Banks of Argentina
Banks established in 1886
Banco Bilbao Vizcaya Argentaria
1886 establishments in Argentina
Commercial buildings completed in 1926
Buildings and structures in Buenos Aires
Companies listed on the Madrid Stock Exchange
Argentine subsidiaries of foreign companies